The men's two hand lift was a weightlifting event held as part of the Weightlifting at the 1904 Summer Olympics programme. It was the second time the event was held.  Four athletes from two nations competed.

Background

This was the second of two appearances of this two hand lift event. It was previously held in 1896.

Competition format

In this weightlifting event, two hands were used in lifting the weights. Any style could be used.

Schedule

Results

References

Sources
 

Weightlifting at the 1904 Summer Olympics